In topology, a branch of mathematics, the loop space ΩX of a pointed topological space X is the space of (based) loops in X, i.e. continuous pointed maps from the pointed circle S1 to X, equipped with the compact-open topology. Two loops can be multiplied by concatenation. With this operation, the loop space is an A∞-space. That is, the multiplication is homotopy-coherently associative.

The set of path components of ΩX, i.e. the set of based-homotopy equivalence classes of based loops in X, is a group, the fundamental group π1(X).

The iterated loop spaces of X are formed by applying Ω a number of times.

There is an analogous construction for topological spaces without basepoint. The free loop space of a topological space X is the space of maps from the circle S1 to X with the compact-open topology.
 
As a functor, the free loop space construction is right adjoint to cartesian product with the circle, while the loop space construction is right adjoint to the reduced suspension. This adjunction accounts for much of the importance of loop spaces in stable homotopy theory. (A related phenomenon in computer science is currying, where the cartesian product is adjoint to the hom functor.) Informally this is referred to as Eckmann–Hilton duality.

Eckmann–Hilton duality 
The loop space is dual to the suspension of the same space; this duality is sometimes called Eckmann–Hilton duality. The basic observation is that

where  is the set of homotopy classes of maps ,
This homeomorphism is essentially that of currying, modulo the quotients needed to convert the products to reduced products.

Thus, setting  (the  sphere) gives the relationship

.

See also 

 Eilenberg–MacLane space
 Free loop
 Fundamental group
 Gray's conjecture
 List of topologies
 Loop group
 Path (topology)
 Quasigroup
 Spectrum (topology)
 Path space (algebraic topology)

References

Topology
Homotopy theory
Topological spaces